Alimony is a 1924 American silent drama film directed by James W. Horne and starring Grace Darmond, Warner Baxter, and Ruby Miller. In the United Kingdom it was released under the title When the Crash Came.

Plot
As described in a film magazine review, Jimmy Mason, inventor, and his wife Marion are in desperate circumstances. When he becomes ill, she sells his invention to Granville, a wealthy oil man. Granville covets Marion and, with the wiles of adventuress Gloria Du Bois, separates Marion from Jimmy over the husband's supposed dalliance with that other woman. Jimmy soon goes broke after Marion demands and gets a huge alimony allowance. With the money thus obtained, she comes to his rescue and reestablishes his fortunes by marrying him on her terms, and they face a happy future together.

Cast

References

Bibliography
 Connelly, Robert B. The Silents: Silent Feature Films, 1910-36, Volume 40, Issue 2. December Press, 1998.
 Munden, Kenneth White. The American Film Institute Catalog of Motion Pictures Produced in the United States, Part 1. University of California Press, 1997.

External links

1924 films
1924 drama films
1920s English-language films
American silent feature films
Silent American drama films
American black-and-white films
Film Booking Offices of America films
Films directed by James W. Horne
1920s American films